Gonzalo Mejía Trujillo (Medellín, 1884-1956) was a Colombian businessman. Together with Guillermo Echavarría Misas, he founded Compañía Colombiana de Navegación Aérea, which was the first aviation company and the provider of the first airmail services in the Americas. He took part in the development of the region of Urabá Antioquia, and of the highway from Bogotá to Turbo.

He also worked in film. He produced the film Bajo el cielo antioqueño, as well as appearing in it.

In the 1920s, the edificio Gonzalo Mejía was constructed on his initiative, and named after him.

References

External links
 Biography of Gonzalo Mejía
 Compañía Colombiana de Navegación Aérea y SCADTA 

Colombian businesspeople
1884 births
1956 deaths